Neustadt is a German surname meaning "new city" or "new town".

Notable people with this surname include:
 Aaron of Neustadt (died 1421), Austrian Talmudist
 Bernardo Neustadt (1925–2008), Argentinian journalist
 Richard Neustadt (1919–2003), American political scientist

References